Otto Carl Reche (24 May 1879 – 23 March 1966) was a German anthropologist and professor from Glatz (Kłodzko), Prussian Silesia. He was active in researching whether there was a correlation between blood types and race. During the Second World War he openly advocated the genocide of ethnic Poles. Once a member of the Nazi Party, he remained active in anthropological issues following the downfall of Nazi Germany.

Education and career 
Reche was educated at the University of Breslau (now the University of Wrocław), the University of Jena and the University of Berlin.

In his career, Reche served as the director of the Departments of Anthropology at the University of Vienna and then the University of Leipzig, and also taught at the University of Hamburg. Among the organizations he was involved in were the Nazi Party and the German Society for Blood Group Research (which he founded along with Paul Steffan). In 1928, Reche and Steffan founded Zeitschrift für Rassenphysiologie, a magazine on the subject.

Blood type research and conclusions 
Reche's work with blood types, involving studies in northwestern Germany, was an attempt to prove a correlation between which blood type a person had and whether they were of German ancestry. He claimed that the three blood types, A, B, and O, were each originally attached to European, Asian, and Native American races, but that interracial marriage had diluted this over the centuries.

Support for the genocide of Poles 
Reche justified the invasion of Poland in 1939 in a letter to Albert Brackmann by stating:

During the Second World War Reche became director of Institute for Racial and Ethnic Sciences in Lipsk. In this position he wrote about ethnic Poles, claiming that they are an "unfortunate mixture" consisting among others of Slavs, Balts and Mongolians and that they should be eliminated to avoid possible mixing with the German race.

Life after the war 
On April 16, 1945, Reche was arrested by American forces for membership in the Nazi Party, but released after sixteen months of detainment.

In 1959, Reche was chosen by a German court investigating the claims of Anna Anderson that she was Anastasia Nikolaevna, a Russian Grand Duchess thought to have been murdered along with the rest of the royal family. He concluded that Anna Anderson was either the Grand Duchess herself or an identical twin. After Anderson's death, however, it was concluded based on DNA evidence that she was not Anastasia.

Reche died near Hamburg in 1966.

See also 
Albert Brackmann
Scientific racism

References

Further reading 

 Geisenhainer, Katja: "Gescheiterte Interventionen Otto Reche und seine Wiener Nachfolge", in: Andre Gingrich; Peter Rohrbacher (Ed.), Völkerkunde zur NS-Zeit aus Wien (1938–1945): Institutionen, Biographien und Praktiken in Netzwerken (Phil.-hist. Kl., Sitzungsberichte 913; Veröffentlichungen zur Sozialanthropologie 27/1). Wien: Verlag der ÖAW 2021, p. 129–142. doi:10.1553/978OEAW86700

1879 births
1966 deaths
People from Kłodzko
People from the Province of Silesia
German anthropologists
German military personnel of World War I
Nazi Party members
University of Breslau alumni
University of Jena alumni
Humboldt University of Berlin alumni
Academic staff of the University of Hamburg
Academic staff of the University of Vienna
Academic staff of Leipzig University